Athipookal (transl. Fig flowers) was an Indian Tamil-language soap opera that aired during weekdays on Sun TV from 3 December 2007 to 14 December 2012. The show starred Devadarshini, Chetan, Sandhya Jagarlamudi, Venkat, Raani, Vietnam Veedu Sundaram, Thilakshi, T. S. Raghavendar, Premi, V.R. Thilakam and among others. It was produced by Saregama and directed by K. Shanmugam, R.P Marudhu and K.Shiva. It is one of the most well known serials that aired on Sun TV in the afternoon slot. It received high praise and was a hit for the channel. The show was retelecasted at the same channel from March 1, 2021 to March 25, 2022 at 10:30 am.

Synopsis
The show story revolves around Padma (Devadarshini) Manokar (Chetan/Sathish) and Karpagam (Sandhya Jagarlamudi). Manohar and Padma are a happy couple, but even after many years of marriage, they are unable to have a child. Padma's sister in law Anjali (Rani) is jealous of Padma's wealth and covertly slips in medicines in Padma's food to make her infertile. Karpagam bears Manokar's child as a surrogate mother. The baby boy is born and named  Shiva. Padma does not know Karpagam is the surrogate mother however Anjali finds out. Things turn bitter when Manokar and Karpagam are falsely accused of having an illegal relationship, and Padma wholeheartedly believes her sister in law and gets angry at Manohar. The subsequent evil schemes Anjali comes up with to separate Padma and Manohar form the crux of the show.

Cast

Main cast
 Devadarshini as Padma
 Chetan / Satheesh Kumar as Mano alias Manokar
 Sandhya Jagarlamudi as Karpagam
 Rani as Anjali, Padma's sister-in-law,

Recurring cast
Initha as Maha (Anjali's assistant)
Sukiran as Dhakshinamoorthy (Karpagam's brother)
Oorvambu Lakshmi as Mangaa (Karpagam's sister-in-law)
Usha as Mangaa's mother
Super Good Kannan as Shekhar, Padma's elder brother, Anjali's husband and Vijay's father
 Vietnam Veedu Sundaram as Krishnaswamy (Mano's uncle)
Venkat as Senthil Kumaran, Karpagam's interest
Sumangali
K. S. Jayalakshmi
V.R. Thilakam as Padma and Sekar's mother
Sangeetha Balan as Saroja
J. Lalitha as Renuka's mother
 Deepa Narendraan / Neelima Rani as Renukha
 T. S. Raghavendar
 Premi
 Kannan as Dilakam
 Dubbing Janaki - Karpagam, Eshwari and Dakshinamoorthy's mother
 Pooja Lokesh as Eshwari, Karpagam's sister 
 Dr. Sharmila as Dr. Jhansi
 Sivakavitha as Senthil's sister
 Ceylon Manohar
 Jashak
 Jangiri Madhumitha as Bhanu
 Devipriya as Regina Victor
 Abijeeth as Vijay

Original Soundtrack
The title song was composed by X.Paulraj and was sung by famous singer Saindhavi with lyrics written by Dr.Kiruthiya.

Remake
 The series has been remade in the Kannada Language as Jo Jo Laali and was broadcast on Udaya TV from 10 April 2017 to 14 June 2019.

References

External links
 Official Website 

Sun TV original programming
2007 Tamil-language television series debuts
Tamil-language television shows
2012 Tamil-language television series endings
2000s Tamil-language television series